is a Prefectural Natural Park in Shiga Prefecture, Japan. Established in 1987, the park comprises areas of the eastern plains of Lake Biwa and the foothills of the Suzuka Mountains.

See also
 National Parks of Japan
 Biwako Quasi-National Park

References

External links
 Map of the Natural Parks in Shiga Prefecture (marked in yellow)

Parks and gardens in Shiga Prefecture
Protected areas established in 1987
1987 establishments in Japan